Harlem Rocker (foaled April 25, 2005 in Ontario) is a Grade I winning Canadian thoroughbred racehorse.

Background
He was  owned by Adena Springs Racing Venture, a partnership headed by Frank Stronach. He was bred by Adena Springs at their Aurora, Ontario division. He is the son of Macho Uno who won the Breeders' Cup Juvenile in 2000. Harlem Rocker has been ridden exclusively by Jockey Eibar Coa and is trained by Todd Pletcher.

Racing career

2008: three-year-old season
Harlem Rocker's racing career began at Gulfstream Park where, after stumbling out of the gate, he rallied on the front stretch to win his maiden race.  He then finished first in an allowance race, also at Gulfstream, in preparation for a start in the Grade III Withers Stakes.  Harlem Rocker won the Withers on April 26, 2008, over a field of 3 other horses, including favorite J Be K.  There was much speculation that Harlem Rocker would follow the path of Bernardini (2006 Preakness winner)  and challenge Big Brown in the 2008 Preakness Stakes.  However, owner Frank Stronach decided to direct the colt towards the Queen's Plate, the first of three races that make up the Canadian Triple Crown.

Harlem Rocker raced in the Plate Trial at Woodbine Racetrack, a prep race for the Queen's Plate.  Going in as the betting favorite, he finished 4th on the synthetic surface known as polytrack.  Todd Pletcher and Stronach then decided that Harlem Rocker was not suited to the artificial racing surface and that the Queen's Plate would not be in his best interest. After shipping back to Belmont Park to train with Todd Pletcher, Harlem Rocker returned to racing on dirt July 13, finishing first at the $500,000 Prince of Wales Stakes, the second leg of the Canadian Triple Crown.

Following his appearance in Canada, Harlem Rocker returned to the United States in August to appear at the 2008 Travers Stakes in Saratoga.  Going up against one of the largest fields in recent history (12 horses), he finished  4th, beaten out by a nose for 3rd place by Pyro.  He next raced in November in the Cigar Mile at Aqueduct Raceway, the same track where he won the Withers Stakes in April.  Harlem Rocker faced a field of nine other horses and battled down the front stretch against Tale of Ekati.  Harlem Rocker crossed the wire first in a photo finish but was disqualified to second place due to interference with Tale of Ekati.  The stewards deemed that Harlem Rocker's move to the inside rail impacted Tale of Ekati's race.

Following the finish of the 2008 racing season, Harlem Rocker experienced abdominal discomfort and was sent for treatment at the Equine Medical Center of Ocala.

Later career
He was scheduled to be returned to training in July, but a respiratory ailment was spotted, and he underwent a "tie-back" surgery, or laryngeal hemiplegia to correct the issue.

Harlem Rocker made his return to racing as a 4 year old in November at Churchill Downs where he finished second in an Allowance Race.  Harlem Rocker has made his first start as a 5 year old facing Quality Road at Gulfstream Park in the Hal's Hope Grade 3 Stakes Race.  He finished in 4th place after being bumped at the start.

Race record

Pedigree

References
 Harlem Rocker's pedigree
 Harlem Rocker Training and Race History
 Harlem Rocker's website

2005 racehorse births
Racehorses bred in Ontario
Racehorses trained in the United States
Thoroughbred family 2-n